36 Hours to Kill is a 1936 American drama film directed by Eugene Forde, written by Lou Breslow and John Patrick, and starring Brian Donlevy, Gloria Stuart, Douglas Fowley, Isabel Jewell, Stepin Fetchit and Julius Tannen. It is based on the short story "Across the Aisle" by W. R. Burnett. The film was released on July 24, 1936, by 20th Century Fox.

Plot
Duke and Jeanie Benson, an outlaw couple hiding out under assumed names in a calm, suburban community, read a newspaper article about a sweepstakes winner who has not yet claimed his prize. Duke realizes that he has the winning ticket and will win $150,000 if he can cash it in without getting apprehended. Fed up with suburban life, Duke decides to board a train to Kansas City, where he bought the ticket, while Jeanie plans to fly there and get a "stooge" to cash in the ticket. At the train station, reporter Frank Evers boards the train and starts a conversation with Duke, who calls himself "Downey." At San Bernardino, Anne Marvis boards the train, followed by Doyle, a process server. Finding the door to Duke's room open, Anne hides in his bed, and when Duke sees Doyle enter in pursuit, he pulls a gun on Doyle, who says that he mistook Duke's "wife" for the woman he was after.

Duke is attracted to Anne, as is Frank. When Jeanie gets on the train because her plane was grounded, she suspects that Duke and Anne are having an affair and pulls a gun on them; however, Duke calms her fears by introducing Frank as Anne's husband. Anne and Frank go along with the ruse. Sometime later, Frank accompanies the conductor to a room next to Duke's, where they listen through a surveillance device to Duke and Jeanie bicker about their plans to have the "boys" meet him in Kansas City. Frank, in reality a G-man, hopes to nab the whole gang and decides to hold off arresting Duke. After Jeanie gets off the train at Albuquerque to board a plane to Kansas City, Duke tries to flirt with Anne, but she rejects his advances. That night, Frank and Anne agree to be honest with each other, and Anne reveals that she is really a Los Angeles reporter and has been subpoenaed to testify before a grand jury concerning a political scandal which she had unearthed. She says that she felt it would be "healthier" to go out-of-state for a while.

When Frank continues to claim that he is a reporter for The Telegraph, Anne indignantly reveals that she works for the paper and knows that he does not. In Topeka, after Flash, a porter, inadvertently finds the listening device in Duke's room, Duke knocks out the conductor. Anne receives a wire that it is all right for her to return to Los Angeles and gets off the train. When Duke sees Frank pursuing him, he gets into Anne's cab. They go to Borden's Sanitarium, where Duke meets Jeanie, who is unhappy to see him with Anne. When Duke reads in a newspaper that another man has surfaced to claim the lottery prize, he sends his shyster lawyer Rickert to dispute the claim to the insurance company that handles the contest. While Rickert is away, Duke kisses Anne and asks her to leave with him after he collects the money. Anne agrees, but he locks her in her room anyway. Jeanie then unbolts the shutters of Anne's room to help her escape, and Anne hitches a ride on a truck, but the driver works for Duke's gang and brings her back to the sanitarium. Upon deducing that Jeanie let Anne out, Duke slugs Jeanie. Frank, impersonating an insurance agent, accompanies Rickert to the sanitarium. Duke shoots Frank as a carload of G-men arrive and then unlocks Anne's door to take her with him, but Jeanie shoots him and then cries over his body. The gang is captured, and Anne is pleased to see that Frank is only wounded. On the train to Los Angeles, Flash comments that Frank and Anne have not come out of their cabin in two days. They kiss and it is revealed that they have recently married.

Cast  
Brian Donlevy as Frank Evers
Gloria Stuart as Anne Marvis
Douglas Fowley as Duke Benson
Isabel Jewell as Jeanie Benson
Stepin Fetchit as Flash
Julius Tannen as Dr. Borden
Warren Hymer as Hazy
Romaine Callender as Simpkins
James Burke as Doyle
Jonathan Hale as Conductor
Gloria Mitzi Carpenter as Gertrude
Charles Lane as Rickert

References

External links 
 

1936 films
1930s English-language films
American drama films
1936 drama films
20th Century Fox films
Films based on works by W. R. Burnett
Films directed by Eugene Forde
American black-and-white films
1930s American films